Melanophidium punctatum, commonly known as Beddome's black shieldtail or Beddome's black earth snake, is a species of shieldtail snake endemic to the Western Ghats of India.

Geographic range
It is found in the Western Ghats between Radhanagari Wildlife Sanctuary in the north and Kanyakumari district (Tamil Nadu) in the south.

Description
Snout rounded; rostral small, just visible from above; frontal as long as or longer than its distance from the end of the snout; suture between the ocular and the frontal less than one third the length of the latter shield. Eye very small. Diameter of body 42 to 48 times in the total length. 15 scales round the middle of the body, 17 behind the head. Ventrals rather more than twice as broad as the contiguous scales, 184–198; subcaudals 15–18. Black above, beautifully iridescent; ventrals and the two lower series of scales on each side with a broad white border.

Type locality: "Travancore, [...] under a stone in the Muti-Kuli Vayal, a little valley on the Asamboo range (4,500 feet elevation)"

References

Further reading

 Beddome, R.H. 1871. Descriptions of new reptiles from the Madras Presidency. Madras Monthly J. Med. Sci., 4: 401-404 [Reprint: J. Soc. Bibliogr. Nat. Sci., London, 1 (10): 324–326, 1940.
 Mason, George E. 1888. Description of a new earth-snake of the genus Silybura from the Bombay Presidency with remarks on little known Uropeltidae. Ann. Mag. Nat. Hist. (6) 22: 184–186.

Uropeltidae
Snakes of Asia
Reptiles of India
Endemic fauna of the Western Ghats
Taxa named by Richard Henry Beddome
Reptiles described in 1871